Bernal/Singleton Transfer Location is a bus-only station located along Bernal Drive and Singleton Blvd. in Dallas, Texas (USA). Unlike many transit centers, Bernal/Singleton Transfer Location does not provide parking, however it does provide an air conditioned/heating facility available on weekday rush hours.

It was intended to become a future rail station on the west rail line towards Grand Prairie as part of DART's 2030 Transit System Plan, though the line was removed from subsequent plans.

References

External links 
Dallas Area Rapid Transit - Bernal/Singleton Transfer Location

Dallas Area Rapid Transit
Bus stations in Dallas